Silver Mountain is a summit east of La Delta in San Bernardino County, California.

History
In January, 1873, a strike on Silver Mountain at what became the Oro Grande Mine, found ore that ran $160 in gold and $18 in silver per ton. This led to the organization of the Silver Mountain Mining District.

References

Mountains of San Bernardino County, California
Mountains of Southern California